Michman Panin, is a 1960 Soviet war film, directed by Mikhail Schweitzer.

Plot
The storyline of the movie is based on the memoirs of an old Bolshevik named Vasily Lukich Panyushkin. It is May 1912. Thirteen political prisoners are being tried in a naval fortress of Kronstadt. They are sentenced to death by hanging. A clandestine Bolshevik organization decides to free the prisoners during their transfer to the place of execution. Vasily Panin (played by Vyacheslav Tikhonov), a junker of a school of naval engineers, is one of those entrusted with this dangerous task. The day Panin is promoted to warrant officer is the day he is baptized by fire. In the evening of that same day Panin arrives at a military vessel named Elizaveta, which is supposed to leave for France the next morning. The freed prisoners go out into the sea on a fishing boat and soon find themselves in a desperate situation. Panin and other Bolshevik seamen onboard Elizaveta hide the fugitives in a non-operational boiler of the ship. Elizaveta sails on. Naval officers and petty officers dart about the ship and are close to discovering the fugitives. Petty officer Savichev (Leonid Kmit) comes across the fugitives, and Panin throws him overboard. Finally, Elizaveta arrives in Gâvres. The fugitives manage to disembark under the guise of sailors on shore leave. Warrant officer Panin is a relief commander. That same evening the crew returns from their shore leave short of thirteen people. Captain Sergeyev of Elizaveta (Nikolai Sergeyev) realizes that warrant officer Panin has something to do with the escape and offers him to remain in France. In France, Panin establishes contact with local Bolshevik emigres, who provide him with the money and a passport to return to Russia. He receives a letter from Vladimir Lenin, in which the latter expresses his regret regarding Panin's being away from the Navy. And then warrant officer Panin decides to return to his ship in Kronstadt. He is arrested and stands trial. At the trial, however, he tells a made-up story about his love affairs, and the court decides to simply demote him to the ranks. Upon becoming a matrose, Panin joins the revolutionary movement yet again.

Cast
 Vyacheslav Tikhonov as Warrant officer Vasily Panin
 Nikolai Sergeyev as Captain Nikolai Vasilyevich Sergeyev
 Nikita Podgorny as Warrant officer Vedernikov 
 Leonid Kuravlyov as Stoker Pyotr Kamushkin
 Ivan Pereverzev as Boatswain Ivan Grigoryev
 Lev Polyakov as Lieutenant Gruzinov
 Oleg Golubitsky as Lieutenant Stanislav Mikhailovich Pekarsky 
 Leonid Kmit as Petty Officer Savichev
 Vladimir Pokrovsky as Executive officer Commander Farafontyev
 Nikolai Pazhitnov as Dr.Bach
 Grigory Shpigel as Father Feoktist, ship's chaplain
 Evgeny Teterin as Admiral Viren
 Daniil Netrebin as Seaman Markelov
 Grigory Mikhailov as Seaman Barabanov
 Nikolai Grabbe as Seaman Rysman
 Rudolf Pankov as Cadet Obysov
 Mikhail Gluzsky as Usoltsev

References

External links

1960 films
1960 war films
1960s Russian-language films
Soviet black-and-white films
Films directed by Mikhail Shveytser
Soviet war films
Soviet historical adventure films
Russian war films
1960s war adventure films
1960s historical adventure films
Russian black-and-white films